Ruby Lopez is an American television host and model.

In 2007, she reported for Comcast SportsNet's new Motorsports show, "Zero to 60", where she interviewed and raced with some of the top drivers. In Fall 2007 Ruby Lopez became the new reporter on "49ers Total Access".

Lopez works as an Associate Producer on two national children's shows.

She was also the winner of the 2003 Miss Latina USA pageant. Ruby then went on to represent the United States in the Miss Latina World Pageant.

She was a contestant in MTV's Final Fu

References

External links
 Ruby Lopez Official Homepage with Bio, Headshots and Demo Reel of this TV Host, Actress, Model and Martial Artist
 Yahoo's Exclusive Videogame show co-hosted by Ruby Lopez
 Ruby Lopez on IMDB, The Internet Movie Database.
 Miss Latina US

American female taekwondo practitioners
San Francisco State University alumni
American sportspeople of Mexican descent
American television personalities of Mexican descent
Living people
Year of birth missing (living people)
21st-century American women